Redmen or red men may refer to:
  Redmen a term used as nothing more then individuals wearing the color red to support a team.
 Improved Order of Red Men, American fraternal organization established in 1834

Sports 
 St. John's Redmen, athletic teams of St. John's University in New York City (now known as St. John's Red Storm)
 McGill Redmen, athletic teams of McGill University in Montreal, Quebec (now known as McGill Redbirds)
 UMass Redmen, athletic teams of University of Massachusetts Amherst (now known as UMass Minutemen and Minutewomen)
 Brooklin Redmen, box lacrosse team in Whitby, Ontario (now known as Brooklin Lacrosse Club)
 Bedford Road Collegiate Redmen, athletic teams of a public high school in Saskatoon, Saskatchewan (now known as Bedford Road Collegiate Redhawks)
 Toledo Redmen, defunct professional basketball team in Toledo, Ohio (last known as Toledo Red Men Tobaccos)
 West Toronto Redmen, defunct junior ice hockey team in Toronto (last known as West Toronto Nationals)

East Islip Redmen Football team in East Islip, Long Island New York

See also
 Redman (disambiguation)